Scott David Ferson is Chair of Uncertainty in Engineering at University of Liverpool, Professor in its School of Engineering, and director of the Institute for Risk and Uncertainty there. Before joining the University of Liverpool, Ferson taught as an adjunct professor at Stony Brook University and did research at Applied Biomathematics, a small think tank on Long Island, New York.   He is a Fellow of the Society for Risk Analysis and a recipient of its Distinguished Educator Award in 2017.  From Shelbyville, Indiana, Ferson received a Ph.D. from Stony Brook University and an A.B. from Wabash College.

Ferson is author or editor of several books and an author of over 100 other scholarly publications, mostly in methods for analyzing risks and uncertainty for environmental and engineering problems.  He developed the notion of the probability box and probability bounds analysis, a technique for distribution-free risk analysis or sensitivity analysis for probabilistic assessments. He authored a series of reports that have been influential in uncertainty quantification for engineering risk assessment and design problems.

References

Academics of the University of Liverpool
American expatriates in the United Kingdom
Stony Brook University alumni
Wabash College alumni
People from Shelbyville, Indiana
Living people
1958 births